Henrik August Angell (22 August 1861 – 26 January 1922) was a Norwegian military officer, sportsman, and writer. He was a ski pioneer and the first Norwegian delegate to the International Olympic Committee.

Early life
Henrik Angell was born at Luster in Sogn og Fjordane and grew up in Bergen, Norway. He was the son of Johan Mølmann Anderson Lysholm Angell (1820–88) and his wife Marie With Bonnevie (1830–1904). He received an education at the Norwegian Military Academy and entered the Norwegian Army.

Military career
He was a colonel and regiment chief from 1911.  He was commander leader of  the Søndermør  Infantry Regiment until 1914 and of the Smaalenene Infantry Regiment  until 1918. He joined the French Foreign Legion in 1918, and participated on the Western Front for France in World War I. It was whilst he was deployed in Northern Russia that he had a severe case of frostbite, resulting in both of his feet and several fingers being amputated. He was appointed as an officer of the Legion of Honour for his service during the North Russia intervention.

Skiing and literary work
Angell was admitted to the skiing club SK Ull in 1898 and was a sports advocate.
He wrote several books promoting skiing and Norwegian nationalism. He also wrote a series of military history books.

Death and legacy
He died during 1922  in  Kristiania (now Oslo), Norway. His statue by Gustav Lærum is located at Holmenkollen in Oslo.

Selected works
Naar et lidet Folk kjæmper for Livet : serbiske Soldaterfortællinger (1914)
Gjennem Montenegro paa ski (1895)
De sorte fjeldes sønner (1896)
Kaptein Jürgensen og Leirdølerne hans (1901)
Et sterkt folk (1902)
Norges krigshistorie (1906) 
Norsk Skilauparsoge  (1908)
Syv-aars-krigen for 17. mai 1807–1814 (1914) 
For Frankrigs ret og ære: fra den franske front (1918)

References

External links
 

1861 births
1922 deaths
People from Luster, Norway
Norwegian Army personnel
Norwegian sports executives and administrators
Norwegian explorers
Norwegian male skiers
Norwegian non-fiction writers
SK Ull members
Officers of the French Foreign Legion
Norwegian people of World War I
Recipients of the Norwegian Medal for Heroic Deeds in Gold
International Olympic Committee members